Flew may refer to:

 Past participle of the verb "to fly", relating to flight
 Flew (surname), list of people with the surname
 Flews, part of canid anatomy